Pereiras is a municipality in the state of São Paulo in Brazil. The population is 8,773 (2020 est.) in an area of 223 km². Its elevation is 490 m.

References

Municipalities in São Paulo (state)